Frederick Cuthbert (1800 – 29 March 1821) was an English amateur cricketer who played first-class cricket from 1816 to 1817.  He was a member of Marylebone Cricket Club (MCC) and made three known appearances in first-class matches. He died from tuberculosis.

References

1800 births
1821 deaths
English cricketers
English cricketers of 1787 to 1825
Marylebone Cricket Club cricketers
William Ward's XI cricketers
19th-century deaths from tuberculosis
Tuberculosis deaths in England